Asgaran (also Romanized as ‘Asgarān; also known as ‘Asgarān Karvan and ‘Askarān) is a city and capital of Karvan District, in Tiran and Karvan County, Isfahan Province, Iran.  At the 2006 census, its population was 4,037, in 1,109 families.

References

Populated places in Tiran and Karvan County

Cities in Isfahan Province